Mi Vida Loca is the ninth major label studio album released by Regional Mexican singer Jenni Rivera in 2007 by Fonovisa Records. There is a talking intro before each song, as well as a final message at the end of the album. Mi Vida Loca earned Rivera the award Regional Mexican Album Of The Year at the 2008 Latin Billboard Music Awards.

Track listing
 Intro: Escuchame
 Mi Vida Loca 2
 Intro: Mi Primer Amor
 Ahora Que Estuve Lejos
 Intro: Look at Me Now
 Mirame
 Intro: Nuestro Padre
 Sangre de Indio
 Intro Que Bonito Se Siente
 La Sopa del Bebe
 Intro: La Manutención 
 Cuanto Te Debo
 Intro: Equivocada 
 I Will Survive
 Intro: Mi Madre y Yo
 Déjame Vivir
 Intro: Mis Hermanos y Yo
 Hermano Amigo
 Intro: Yo Era Su Reina
 Dama Divina
 Intro: Pimienta Y Especies 
 Inolvidable
 Intro: Madre Y Padre 
 Sin Capitán
 Intro: Metamorfosis 
 Mariposa de Barrio
 Gracias Mi Gente

Chart performance

Certifications

References

2007 compilation albums
Jenni Rivera albums
Fonovisa Records albums